Williamson-Dickie Mfg. Co. is an apparel manufacturing company primarily known for its largest brand, Dickies. The company was founded in Fort Worth, Texas, in 1922 by C. N. Williamson and E. E. "Colonel" Dickie, who began a denim bib overall company selling workwear to farm and ranch hands around the Southwest. Today, Dickies is a global brand found in more than 100 countries designing, manufacturing and selling workwear to the automotive, hospitality, construction and medical industries.

Beginnings
Cousins C. N. Williamson and E. E. "Colonel" Dickie were successful salesmen and had already spent 25 years together selling hats in Texas southwest territory.  In 1918, they and a few friends established the U.S. Overall Company in Fort Worth, Texas. Then, in 1922, Col. Dickie, C.N Williamson and his son C. D. Williamson purchased 100% of the Overall Company on a one-third-each basis and renamed it Williamson-Dickie Manufacturing Company.

From its early years, Williamson-Dickie enjoyed steady growth which was slowed only by the Great Depression, and during World War II the company produced millions of uniforms for the nation's armed forces. In converting to civilian production after the war, C. Don Williamson began a strategy of geographical expansion and established new production facilities, warehouses, and sales territories throughout the United States. In the late 1950s, Williamson-Dickie became an international company by expanding into the European market and the Middle Eastern market—where Texas oilmen introduced the Dickies brand to Middle Eastern oil fields.

Present day

Dickies is currently sold in all 50 U.S. states and throughout the world in countries such as Saudi Arabia, South Africa, Australia, Russia, Chile, South Korea, Japan, Taiwan, Iceland, Canada, Germany, France, Italy, Ireland with COH Sales Ltd, Croatia, the Philippines, Poland and Mexico.

In 2008 Williamson-Dickies acquired the Canadian Kodiak Group Holdings Inc.
In 2013 Dickies acquired Walls.

In 2014, Jerry Leigh of California became the exclusive licensee for Dickies Girl juniors’ apparel.

VF Corporation acquired Williamson-Dickie in 2017 for $820 million in cash.

Williamson-Dickie Europe Ltd is based in the UK in Westfield, Somerset. Previously known as Dickies UK, this division of the company now operates across the entirety of Europe and the Middle East for both the workwear and streetwear product ranges.

In June 2020, Dickies collaborated with the Japanese brand FACETASM creating a capsule collection.

References

External links

VF Corporation
Clothing companies of the United States
Clothing companies established in 1918
Manufacturing companies based in Fort Worth, Texas
Jeans by brand
Punk fashion
Workwear
1918 establishments in Texas